"0 to 100 / The Catch Up" is a song recorded by Canadian rapper Drake. It was released on July 15, 2014, by Young Money Entertainment, Cash Money Records, and Republic Records. The song was certified Platinum by the Recording Industry Association of America (RIAA) on January 30, 2015, for selling over 1 million digital copies in the United States.

Composition
"0 to 100 / The Catch Up" is a two part song with a length of six minutes and eight seconds. The first song, "0 to 100", is a stripped-back hip hop song that sonically and thematically resembles Drake's "Started from the Bottom" from his third studio album, Nothing Was the Same (2013). Instead of "starting from the bottom", "0 to 100" speaks of the rapper going from zero to one-hundred in order to gain ground on all of his competition. The second half of the song, titled "The Catch Up", features a sample of an unreleased James Blake song, and contrasts the boisterous claims of the first half with a pensive promise: that "if [Drake] hasn't passed you yet, watch [him] catch up now."

Critical reception
The song received critical acclaim from music critics, appearing on several year-end top 10 lists. In July 2014,  Billboard listed "0 to 100" as one of the "10 Best Songs of 2014 (so far)" saying that "months after releasing another hit album, Drizzy returned briefly to take it from '0 to 100' with careening bars punctuated by boasts like 'If I ain't the greatest, then I'm headed for it'." The magazine also listed the track as the best rap song of 2014. Rolling Stone listed the song as one of the "50 Best Songs of 2014", stating that it is "six minutes that pan across the whole Drake saga". HipHopDX named the song as one of the "Top 10 Singles of 2014".

The song was nominated for Best Rap Performance and Best Rap Song at the 57th Annual Grammy Awards.

Usage in media
The song was used in a Sprite commercial starring Drake and Nas. The commercial was supposed to promote a limited-edition line of Sprite cans with hip-hop lyrics printed on them called "Obey Your Verse". The Sprite line featured the "Know yourself, know your worth" lyric from this song.

The lyric "She gon' be upset if she keep scrollin' to the left, dawg / She gon' see some shit that she don't wanna see" is referenced in Letterkenny 1x06 "A Fuss in the Back Bush".

The song is also featured in the NBA 2K16 basketball videogame soundtrack and is usually played during Golden State Warriors pre-match cutscenes as Warriors player Stephen Curry is mentioned in the song.

Remixes
The instrumental became very popular among hip-hop artists, with several rappers such as the late XXXTentacion, Cassidy, Fat Trel, Remy Ma, David Stones, Montana of 300, G-Eazy, G-Unit (50 Cent, Lloyd Banks, Tony Yayo, Young Buck and Kidd Kidd), Gudda Gudda, Jin, Joell Ortiz, Lil Durk, Meek Mill, Ace Hood, Kurt Rock, Juice Box Boys, Papoose, Problem, Rich Homie Quan, Soulja Boy, Stiz Grimey, YFN Lucci, Uncle Murda, Vado, Waka Flocka Flame, Lil Mouse, Wiz Khalifa, Alpha Wann, Ernia and Stormzy recording their own versions of the song. The instrumental was used at the 2014 BET Hip Hop Awards for an on-stage cypher featuring various artists.

Personnel 
Adapted from TIDAL and comments to HNHH.

 Drake – vocals, songwriting
 Boi-1da – production
 Noel Cadastre – recording, additional drum programming

"0 to 100"

 Boi-1da – production, songwriting
 Vinylz – songwriting
 Frank Dukes – songwriting, sample producer
 Chester Hansen – bass (uncredited; songwriter on sample)

"The Catch Up"

 Nineteen85 – co-production 
 40 – co-production 
 James Blake – songwriting, sample producer (uncredited)

Charts

Weekly charts

Year-end charts

Certifications

Release history

References

Drake (musician) songs
2014 songs
2014 singles
Song recordings produced by 40 (record producer)
Song recordings produced by Boi-1da
Song recordings produced by Vinylz
Songs written by Drake (musician)
Songs written by Vinylz
Songs written by Boi-1da
Songs written by 40 (record producer)
Songs written by Frank Dukes
Songs written by Nineteen85